Storskrymten is a  tall mountain in Norway. The top of the mountain is a tripoint for three counties and three municipalities: Oppdal Municipality (Trøndelag county), Sunndal Municipality (Møre og Romsdal county), and Lesja Municipality (Innlandet county).

It is the highest mountain in Trøndelag county as well as the highest mountain in Sunndal municipality. It is located in the Dovrefjell mountains and it is inside the Dovrefjell–Sunndalsfjella National Park. The mountain is surrounded by several other mountains including Salhøa and Grøvudalstinden to the west and Skuleggen to the southeast.

Name
The first element is stor which means "big" and the last element is the finite form of skrymt which means "uncanny thing", "fright", or "scare" (the hillsides of the mountain are extremely steep).

See also
List of mountains of Norway

References

Lesja
Oppdal
Sunndal
Highest points of Norwegian counties
Mountains of Innlandet
Mountains of Møre og Romsdal
Mountains of Trøndelag
One-thousanders of Norway